Hradec may refer to places:

Czech Republic
Hradec (Havlíčkův Brod District), a municipality and village in the Vysočina Region
Hradec (Plzeň-South District), a municipality and village in the Plzeň Region
Hradec, a village and part of Mnichovo Hradiště in the Central Bohemian Region
Hradec, a village and part of Rokle in the Ústí nad Labem Region
Hradec substation, a large electrical substation near Hradec
Hradec, a village and part of Stříbrná Skalice in the Central Bohemian Region
Hradec Králové, a city
Hradec Králové Region
Hradec Králové District
Hradec nad Moravicí, a town in the Moravian-Silesian Region
Hradec-Nová Ves, a municipality and village in the Olomouc Region
Jindřichův Hradec, a town in the South Bohemian Region
Krty-Hradec, a municipality and village in the South Bohemian Region
Levý Hradec, an early medieval gord near Prague

Slovakia
Hradec, a borough of Prievidza